William Mody  (by 1524 – 1558 or later) was an English politician.

He was a Member (MP) of the Parliament of England for New Shoreham in April and November 1554.

References

16th-century deaths
English MPs 1554
English MPs 1554–1555
Year of birth uncertain